The City of Toronto Paramedic Services (TPS; formerly known as Toronto Emergency Medical Services), is the statutory emergency medical services provider in Toronto, Ontario, Canada. The service is operated as a division of the City of Toronto, under the Community & Social Services cluster. The service is funded by the municipal tax base, and operates similarly to other municipal divisions, such as the Toronto Parks, Forestry & Recreation division, or the Toronto Water division, but retains operational independence from other divisions. While under municipal government control, it is subject to provincial legislation and licensing. It is not the only service provider in its area; private-for-profit medical transport services also provide routine, non-emergency transports and coverage for special events, but the statutory emergency medical system is the only provider permitted to service emergency calls.

History
The City of Toronto has operated an ambulance service directly on an uninterrupted basis since 1883, when the City of Toronto Health Department acquired two ambulances to transport those with infectious diseases to the local sanitarium. Full-time emergency ambulance service began in 1888, with the provision of emergency ambulance service by the Toronto Police Force, which eventually operated four horse-drawn vehicles. Prior to these two municipal initiatives, ambulance service was provided for the young city by a variety of means, including both hospital-based and private companies. This 'broad spectrum' approach to service delivery would continue for more than ninety years.

Toronto may very well be able to claim to have the first formally trained 'ambulance attendants' in North America, with the Toronto Police Force ambulance service staff receiving five days of formal training in their jobs from the St. John Ambulance Brigade in 1889. Training included first aid skills, anatomy and physiology. Such training for ambulance attendants was unheard of at that time, outside of military circles. The police constables assigned to the ambulance also did regular policing, when not required for ambulance calls. As the city grew and technology progressed, so did the ambulance service. The first motorized ambulance was actually purchased by a local funeral home in 1911, and the Toronto Police Ambulance Service began the conversion from horse-drawn to motorized vehicles in 1913, with the process largely completed by 1918. Over the years, the two City of Toronto departments would have their services supplemented by more than 130 individual ambulance operators, most of them private companies, and in suburban areas by several of the tiny, local fire departments. The two municipal services would finally be merged in 1933, when the Toronto Police Department turned the operation of their ambulances over to the Department of Public Health, and ended their involvement in the city's ambulance service.

This service would grow again in 1953, as the result of the creation of the municipality of Metropolitan Toronto, dramatically expanding the required service area. Service would continue in this fashion until 1967, when the amalgamated City's suburban fire departments surrendered their ambulances, resulting in the evolution of the Department of Public Health Ambulance Service into the City-operated Department of Emergency Services (DES). Some private companies, and one operated by the provincial government, would continue to operate in 'Metro' Toronto until 1975, although with centralized dispatch services provided by DES.

The Metropolitan Toronto Department of Ambulance Services was created in 1975, and absorbed the five remaining private ambulance companies and single provincial service, providing a single, unified ambulance service in Metro Toronto. Known colloquially as Metro Toronto Ambulance or simply Metro Ambulance (although never its official name) the service provided ambulance services from 1975 to 1998.

Metropolitan Toronto was restructured during 1998, transforming it from a regional government overseeing six member municipalities into a single, unified city, and many municipal and regional services were restructured as a result. Metro Ambulance became Toronto Ambulance then Toronto Emergency Medical Services in order to reflect its evolving role from primarily a provider of medical transportation to an actual provider of medical care.

The service introduced its first paramedics in 1984 (although experiments in pre-hospital advanced life support actually began in 1969). Toronto EMS introduced many other innovations, including the concept of dedicated ground-based critical care transport ambulances, as well as many specialty support units described in this article, many of which were originally conceived and pioneered by the service.

As of April 2005, the departments and commissioners were replaced by divisions under the City Manager (and Deputy Managers). Toronto EMS now operates under the city's Emergency Medical Services Division. It is the largest municipal EMS operation in Canada.

In July 2014, Chief Paul Raftis announced that as part of a rebranding effort, Toronto EMS will change its name to Toronto Paramedic Services. The change follows a national trend and drive for the adoption of Paramedic as the publicly recognized title for prehospital emergency care providers. On October 1, the new name came to effect.

Uniforms

Uniforms consist of:

 Dark navy short or long sleeve police style shirt with departmental crest, reflective stripes around arms and Toronto Paramedic in reflective print on chest and back.
 Chartreuse high visibility jacket with Toronto Paramedic in reflective print on back as well as job title (Paramedic, Supervisor etc...) front and back.
 Dark navy cargo pants with reflective stripes around lower leg.
 White shirts for Supervisory/Management staff.
 Bicycle helmet and shorts for bike crews.
 Hard hat with visor as required (construction sites, vehicle extrication etc...).
 Black safety boots/shoes.
 FR Military style tactical shirt/pants, gloves, Ballistic helmet/riot helmet and Ballistic vest for tactical units.
 HAZMAT suits for CBRNE units.
 Dress uniform consisting of dark navy pants and tunic, white shirt, navy tie and forage cap. Paramedic uniforms have royal blue cap band and striping on pants. Management staff have black maple laurels as well as gold piping on cap peak. Striping is orange-gold for the honour guard.

Fleet
Of the 242 vehicles in the Toronto Paramedic Services fleet, 150 are CMVSS / Ontario Standard Type III ambulances. Of these, approximately 100 are in service at any time on a typical, mid-week, day shift. These vehicles are currently supplied by Crestline Coach Ltd. . They are mounted on Chevrolet Express van chassis with boxes custom built by Crestline to suit the needs of the service. The department currently employs Chevrolet Tahoe SUVs for First Response and supervisory vehicles as well as an assortment of fully equipped but unmarked vehicles (Primarily Dodge Caravan and Ford Taurus) for senior management. Toronto Paramedic Services currently operates a fleet of custom built busses and equipment support vehicles for use during mass-casualty or large-scale events. Toronto Paramedic Services operates its own repair facilities, located at the service's Headquarters complex. All maintenance and repair work (with the exception of body work), and all equipment, radio, and medical electronics maintenance and repairs are performed on site by service staff.

Fleet numbering
 5XX - Paramedic Supervisor, Rapid Response, Special Operations
 4XX,8XX - Ambulance, West
 9XX - Ambulance, East
 ESUXX - Emergency Support Unit

Current fleet
2006 Orion Vii
1 One example in service on Toronto Islands due to road width restrictions2 Special Operations3 Unmarked, issued to senior operations staff4 Used for transporting large groups/special teams for events or deployment5 Equipped with multiple, mission specific pods

Historic/retired vehicles

1 Vehicle actually owned by Lambton County heritage museum. Previously on display at Toronto EMS HQ. Similar to vehicles that would have been operated in Toronto during Late 19th/Early 20th century. http://www.horsedrawnambulance.com2Multiple model years used by department until final retirement. 3 Examples may still be in service as utility vehicles

Staff

Toronto Paramedic Services has 1,207 members including paramedics and other support staff. These are categorized as follows:

 Paramedics
 Level I - Primary Care Paramedic (PCP) - 428 positions. Must complete 1,400 hours of training in a community college prior to employment. Successful completion of provincial certification exams is also required.
 Level II - Primary Care Paramedic Enhanced - 151 positions. Requires an additional 572 hours of training in order to use an expanded skill set and scope of practice. 
 Level III - Advanced Care Paramedic (ACP) - 290 positions. In addition Level II training requires a further 360 hours of training and 480 hours of preceptorship.
 CCTU - Critical Care Paramedic (CCP) - 18 positions. In addition to Level III training, CCTU requires an additional 1,142 hours of training and 240 hours of preceptorship. Typically work only on Critical Care Transport ambulances, pictured right.
 Paramedic Superintendent - Paramedic Superintendent - Unknown Amount. The Superintendent is above the ranks of the following, they are considered a staff member within the department. They train, evaluate, and interview our paramedics. Trainers are known as F.T.O, Field training officers. 
 Paramedic commander - Paramedic commander - Unknown amount. This is the highest-ranking paramedic to most likely find on duty. They are classified as a very high-ranking unit they are equivalent to a chief superintendent within Toronto Police services. They are the highest ranking unit aside from the Deputy chief, and chief themselves.

The total number of paramedics is 887.

 Other staff
 Management staff - 72 positions.
 Support staff - 134 positions.
 Emergency Medical Dispatchers - 125 positions. (the Toronto Paramedic Services trains its own EMDs)
 Other support roles/not specified - 6 positions.

Communications

Toronto Paramedic Services operates its own Communications and System Control Centre (called a Central Ambulance Communications Center or CACC "Kaack"), including emergency medical dispatch, patient distribution and system oversight. Toronto Paramedic Services participates in the community-wide 9-1-1 system, and triages emergency calls using the Advanced Medical Priority Dispatch System. The system uses Computer-Aided Dispatch, including Tritech VisiCAD, augmented by PDS and Optima Live software and technology. The service utilizes a satellite-based Automatic Vehicle Locating system in order to ensure that the closest appropriate response resource is consistently sent to each emergency call;  all emergency response resources are included. The service utilizes a 700 mHz P25 Phase II trunking radio system for dispatch purposes. The Control Centre has direct landline contact with the 9-1-1 Center, all other emergency services, all acute care hospitals, and all Paramedic Stations. The service utilizes “Language Line” service to provide instant simultaneous translation of emergency calls in more than 140 languages. Toronto Paramedic Services operates the largest EMS Communications Centre in Canada, which was recently accredited as an International Centre of Excellence by the International Academy of Emergency Dispatch.

Operations

Service is provided to a residential population of approximately 3.2 million people, which rises to approximately 5 million on most business days.

Emergency service headquarters (which is shared with Toronto Fire Services, but both services operate independently) is located at 4330 Dufferin Street in Toronto. This facility includes administrative offices, some education facilities, the Communications Centre, Fleet Maintenance, Planning and Operational Support, and Materials Management/Logistics.The service is supplemented by well-developed Paramedic Services in neighbouring communities on three sides, with Lake Ontario providing the southern boundary of the service area. Air ambulance operations are provided within the City of Toronto by Ornge, a privately owned air ambulance contractor, under contract to the Government of Ontario.

Based upon information provided by Toronto Paramedic Services, the service processed in excess of 535,000 calls through its Control Centre in 2007 (the most recent year for which complete data is available), resulting in 223,769 emergency calls being dispatched. Using the AMPDS system, which triages calls by severity for dispatch purposes, the actual dispatch volume by category for that same year was:

 Echo: 4,311
 Delta: 76,595
 Charlie: 31,126
 Bravo: 64,572
 Alpha: 36,674
 Non-Emerg: 25,775

Ambulance Stations

District 1 - Northwest
The District 1 Hub is located at 01 Station (1300 Wilson Ave). The Northwest quadrant is bounded roughly by Steeles Avenue to the north, Eglinton Avenue to the south, Yonge Street to the east, and Highway 427 & Mississauga border to the west.

District 2 - Northeast
The District 2 Hub is located at 20 Station (2430 Lawrence Ave E). The Northeast quadrant is bounded roughly by Steeles Avenue to the north, Eglinton Avenue to the south, the Scarborough-Pickering Townline and Rouge River to the east, and Yonge Street to the west.

District 3 - Southwest
The District 3 Hub is located at 30 Station (100 Turnberry Ave). The Southwest quadrant is bounded roughly by Eglinton Avenue to the north, Lake Ontario to the south, Yonge Street to the east, and Etobicoke Creek to the west.

District 4 - Southeast
The District 4 Hub is located at 42 Station (1535 Kingston Rd). The Southeast quadrant is bounded roughly by Eglinton Avenue to the north, Lake Ontario to the south and east, and Yonge Street to the west.

District 5 - Special Operations
The District 5 Hub is located at 55 Station (5700 Bathurst St). District 5 has stations in multiple quadrants and is responsible for Toronto Paramedic Services’ special operations teams, which include: Response Units, Marine Unit, Critical Care Transport Unit (CCTU), CBRNE, ETF, Bike Unit, and Emergency Support Units.

Special operations
In addition to regular operations, Toronto Paramedic Services staffs a Special Operations Division, tasked with the provision of Paramedic services in unusual circumstances. The elements of this unit include:

Tactical Unit - Cross-trained paramedics providing medical support to the Toronto Police Emergency Task Force.
Marine Unit - Cross-trained paramedics staffing the patrol vessels of the Toronto Police Marine Unit in order to provide support for Toronto Police personnel, EMS services on the waters of Lake Ontario, and EMS service to the Toronto Islands.
HUSAR - Specially-trained paramedics operate together with elements of the Toronto Fire Services, Toronto Police Service and Sunnybrook Health Sciences Centre Emergency Physicians to provide a joint-service Heavy Urban Search and Rescue team.
CBRNE (Chemical, Biological, Radioactive, Nuclear & Explosive) - Specially-trained paramedics operate together with elements of the Toronto Police Service and Toronto Fire Services to provide a joint-service Terrorism/Hazardous Materials Response team.
Public Safety Unit - Cross-trained paramedics providing medical support to the Toronto Police Public Order Unit
Emergency Response Unit - Single paramedics in SUVs, tasked solely with response to high priority emergency calls.
Bicycle Unit - Paramedics equipped with mountain bikes, capable of providing either BLS or ALS services in off-road areas, or at special events. Team also works in concert with the Toronto Police bike team to provide first response capabilities in the Entertainment District on weekend nights.
Emergency Support Unit - Paramedics trained to operate the service's busses and equipment trucks. These respond to all potential Mass Casualty Incidents (fires, multi-patient car accidents etc...), support for large crowd situations such as festivals and parades as well as responding to all calls involving aircraft at Toronto Pearson International Airport

Challenges
As a result of how Canada's universal healthcare system is set up, hospital in-patient beds and Emergency Departments tend to be severely overcrowded, resulting in difficulties for paramedics transferring the care of their patients to hospital staff in a timely manner. Two- to four-hour delays in the transfer of care are commonplace, and six- to eight-hour delays are not unheard of. When this occurs, the service's ability to provide service to emergency calls in a timely manner will often degrade, because of decreased unit availability. Multiple stakeholders and various levels of government are currently seeking solutions to this problem, but have, so far, experienced only limited success.

The funding for Toronto Paramedic Services occurs as a result of a mixed formula, with fifty percent of funding coming from the municipal tax base and fifty percent from the provincial government. The funding of Toronto Paramedic Services is based upon its census population, not its business day population. As a result, there are always more people requiring EMS services than the system has been funded for.

Language barriers and cultural misperceptions in Toronto's multicultural landscape are commonplace for Toronto's paramedics. The service subscribes to Language Line, a simultaneous telephone-based translation service which operates in more than 140 languages. This service is used by Emergency Medical Dispatchers processing 9-1-1 calls, or by paramedics treating patients in the field, on a daily basis. The service also operates its own ethnocultural access program.

The 'Baby Boom' generation is aging. As it does so, all of those 'boomers' become net consumers of health care, driving up demand for services. Simultaneously, all of those 'boomers' employed by the service in the early 1970s are reaching the end of their careers and retiring. Since subsequent generations are typically much smaller, the service is experiencing difficulty in recruiting suitably trained replacement staff, just as demand for services is increasing.

Research

Over the years, the presence of such a large system and call volume, along with a commitment to consistently capture high quality data, has permitted Toronto EMS to become a 'test-bed' for research projects involving both EMS and emergency medicine. This has resulted in a service which is extremely research-oriented and interested in outcome-based medicine. While this has provided any number of research opportunities for physicians and emergency medicine residents through the Sunnybrook Centre for Prehospital Medicine (the Base Hospital), it has also permitted paramedics to function as supporting and as lead researchers, and in some cases, as the principal researcher of their own projects. All research conducted at Toronto EMS is pre-approved by the University of Toronto Research Ethics Committee, and the findings of research conducted at Toronto EMS, by both physicians and paramedics, has been published in respected, peer-reviewed, international journals.

Community involvement
Toronto paramedics are heavily involved in various community programs and partnerships. Toronto's paramedics are active participants in the community which they serve. At the 'grass roots' level, Toronto's paramedics and EMDs fund a children's breakfast club, ensuring a nutritious breakfast for the children who live in several of the city's housing projects. Paramedics also participate in a variety of other events in the community, including their enthusiastic (and occasionally successful) participation in the dragon boat races staged annually by the city's Chinese community. As another little known fact of community involvement by paramedics, all of the floats in the city's annual Santa Claus Parade (one of North America's largest), are driven by volunteers from Toronto Paramedic Services, including both paramedics and a variety of other staff.

See also 

Paramedicine in Canada
List of EMS Services in Ontario
Paramedics in Canada
Emergency Medical Services in Canada

Emergency Services in Toronto
Toronto Police Service
Toronto Fire Services

Employee association

 Toronto Paramedic Association

References

External links
 

EMS
Ambulance services in Canada